Middle Lake is a lake at an elevation of . It is along the main branch of the Clinton River.

Middle Lake connects downstream to Dollar Lake to the south and upstream to Deer Lake to the north.

Cemetery
Lakeview Cemetery sits on the western shore of Middle Lake.  The cemetery is one of the oldest cemeteries in northern Oakland County and many of the original settlers and developers of Independence Township are buried there.

Middle Lake was formerly named Cemetery Lake until the 1960s.

Fish
Middle Lake fish include Largemouth Bass, Bluegill and Perch.

References

Lakes of Oakland County, Michigan
Lakes of Michigan
Lakes of Independence Township, Michigan